Tigran Maytesian (born November 10, 1970) is an Armenian-born Russian-Belgian classical violinist, Doctor of Arts. He is a soloist and chamber musician, a professor, past artistic director of the International Festival des Minimes in Brussels, the International Festival Sint Carolus Borromeuskerk in Antwerp and the International Festival at the Cathédrale Notre-Dame-de-la-Treille de Lille, France, and currently artistic director of the Festival St Andrieskerk in Antwerp, Festival Catharina and Festival Chapel for Europe in Brussels, a scientific researcher and consultant who resides and works in Belgium.

Life and music studies 

Tigran Maytesian was born in Sevan, Armenia.

During his studies in Tallinn, Tigran Maytesian met Igor Bezrodny, a distinguished violinist and pedagogue of the 20th century, who initiated him into the traditions of the Russian violin school of Abram Yampolsky (Bezrodny was a student of the latter). Since then Tigran has followed the best practices of the Russian violin school with its focus on technical skills, relaxed handplay, peculiar sense for the acoustic characteristics of the violin, the capabilities for creating sound, the richness and color of the created sound, and the artistic freedom and self-development of the violinist.

Career and concerts 

His performance career started during his studies, when from 1987 until 1998 he was a concertmaster (first violin) in the orchestra of the State Radio and Television of Armenia conducted by Gevorg Adzhemian. On invitation by the Estonian Radio "Fourth Station" and the Conservatory of Estonia, from 1993 onwards, he has regularly performed in Scandinavia. Since 2000, he lives in Belgium and over 3 years, from 2002 until 2005, he served as the first violin at the National Chamber Orchestra of the Grand Duchy of Luxembourg. 
He has performed in many recitals and concert series with different pianists and renowned orchestras in Russia, Armenia, Ukraine, Belarus, Kazakhstan, and Israel as well as throughout West-European countries (Finland, Estonia, Luxemburg, Belgium, Poland, Slovakia, the Netherlands, and France). Throughout his career, Tigran Maytesian collaborated with a lot of prominent conductors such as Gevorg Adzhemian (Armenia), Yuri Alperten (Estonia), Alexander Yakupov, Andrey Krouzhkov, Igor Lerman, Andrey Karapishchenko (Russia), Vyacheslav Prilepin, Alexander Sosnovsky (Belarus), Jeannot Vaymerskirch (Luxemburg). Daniel Blumenthal (Belgium) is one of the pianists accompanying him on a regular basis. Among other pianists with whom he gave concerts in different countries are Elisabeth Ginsburg (Moscow, Russia), Irina Tsys, Konstantin Zenkin, Andrey Krouzhkov (Moscow, Russia), Marrit Gerets (Estonia), Luba Harutyunyan (Belgium), Luc De Vos (Belgium), Ruben Chakhmakhchyan (Armenia), and Joseph Ermin (Ukraine).

He has founded the "Mind Speller" Chamber orchestra transformed from a String quartet, where, since its establishment in 2011, he has been acting as its conductor, soloist or the first violin at different concerts.

In 2012 he became artistic director of the International Festival des Minimes in Brussels (Belgium) upon invitation by Abbé Jacques Van der Biest, honorary citizen of the city of Brussels, and by Prince Amaury de Merode, President of the "Centre d'Oeuvres de Merode" (Brussels, Belgium). He continued and expanded this initiative in 2013, to include also the International Festival Sint Carolus Borromeuskerk in Antwerp (Belgium) and  the International Festival at the Cathédrale Notre-Dame-de-la-Treille de Lille, France.
Starting from 2016 Tigran Maytesian has been acting as artistic director of the non-profitable musical association Pro Musica Pulchra guiding a series of music festivals: Festival Catharina in Brussels, Festival St.Andrieskerk in Antwerp and Festival Chapel for Europe in Brussels with participation of young talented musicians from different countries.

Tigran Maytesian has participated in various music festivals, including International Classical Music Festival "January Music Nights" in Brest, Belarus in 2013.

He performs with a violin from the 17th century Italian master 
Nicola Amati and a violin from the 18th century Italian master Giuseppe Guarneri

Pedagogue 

Since 2008, Tigran Maytesian has been appointed a professor at the Lemmens Institute (Lemmensinstituut - Conservatory of the Catholic University Leuven, Belgium) to conduct two classes: solo violin and chamber music. Alongside his performance career he has concentrated on the pedagogical activities and successfully prepared several students for international solo violin and chamber music competitions. Besides teaching at the Lemmens Institute in Leuven, Belgium he regularly conducts master classes in conservatoires and music schools in Belgium, Russia, Armenia, Kazakhstan, for both solo violinists and chamber musicians.

Scientific research 

Tigran Maytesian showed great interest in exploring different aspects of classical music and its influence on human brain perception and functioning.  In 2011 he became professor at the Medical School (Laboratory for Neuro- and Psychophysiology) at the Catholic University Leuven (Katholieke Universiteit Leuven), Belgium. Since then he has been actively involved in the  "Mind Speller" project  (http://simone.neuro.kuleuven.be), participating in this scientific research together with his colleague Professor Marc Van Hulle. Among other major aspects within the "Mind Speller" project  is a study of the connection between music and emotions by means of electro-encephalography (EEG). The ultimate aim is to develop an "affective brain–computer interface" with which patients with language disorders, due to neurological diseases such aphasia, autism, and dementia, can express their emotions via EEG without using facial expressions, gestures or other forms of muscular activity. Professor Maytesian has successfully promoted this project at universities in Belarus, Armenia and Russia (Moscow).

Tigran Maytesian is a Doctor of Arts (Russia) and, since 2013, a scientific advisor for Scientific Center of Interdisciplinary research of Musical creativity of the Moscow Conservatory named after P. I. Tchaikovsky.

Honours and awards 

Tigran Maytesian is an honorary doctor and a member of Arts department at the International Academy for Natural and Social Sciences, an honorary member of the Ararat International Academy of Sciences (Paris, France) and a regular member of the Europäische Akademie der Naturwissenschaften(Hannover, Germany).

Klassiek Centraal nominated the performance of Tigran Maytesian with "Russian Camerata", the Chamber Orchestra of Tver Philharmonics, under the direction of Andrey Krouzhkov, in February 2014 as the Best Concert of the year and awarded them the Goulden Label prize.

References

External links 
 
 Энциклопедия Европейской академии естественных наук
 Московская государственная консерватория имени П. И. Чайковского
 Армянская энциклопедия фонда "Хайазг"
 В Бресте снова играет скрипач Тигран Майтесян. Подробности - на сайте TOMIN.BY.
 Скрипач Тигран Майтесян: "В Бресте потрясающий слушатель!". Подробности - на сайте TOMIN.BY.
 Armeens eredoctoraat voor professor Marc Van Hulle

Armenian classical violinists
Russian classical violinists
Male classical violinists
1970 births
Living people
Violin pedagogues
Belgian classical violinists
Moscow Conservatory alumni
21st-century classical violinists
21st-century Russian male musicians